The Consultative Assembly of Saudi Arabia, also known as Majlis ash-Shura or Shura Council, is the formal advisory body of Saudi Arabia. It is a deliberative assembly that advises the King on issues that are important to Saudi Arabia. It has the power to propose laws to the King of Saudi Arabia and his cabinet to prove it and pass it. It has 150 members, all appointed by the king and chosen "from amongst scholars, those of knowledge, expertise and specialists".  Since 2013, the Assembly has included 30 female members out of the total of 150 members, after a 20 percent minimum quota for women was imposed. The Consultative Assembly is headed by a Speaker. , the Speaker was Abdullah ibn Muhammad Al ash-Sheikh, in line with a tradition that kept the post in that family. The Assembly is based in al-Yamamah Palace, Riyadh.

Influence
The Consultative Assembly is permitted to propose draft laws and forward them to the king, but only the King has the power to pass or enforce them. However, the mandate of Majlis Al-Shura was broadened in 2004 to include proposing new legislation and amending existing laws without prior submission to the King. The Assembly has the power to interpret laws, as well as examine annual reports referred to it by state ministries and agencies. It can also advise the king on policies that he submits to it, along with international treaties and economic plans. The Assembly is also authorized to review the country's annual budget, and call in ministers for questioning.

The influence of the Assembly in its present form comes from its responsibility for the kingdom's five-year development plans, from which the annual budgets are derived, its ability to summon government officials for questioning, and its role as policy debate forum.

History
The first Majlis ash-Shura (Consultative Assembly) was founded by King Abdulaziz on 13 January 1926. It was first named the Shura Council of the Hijaz and chaired by his son, Prince Faisal. However, the complete institutionalization of the assembly was finalized in 1932. Later, it was expanded to include twenty-five members at the beginning of King Saud's reign. However, its functions were transferred to the Cabinet of Ministers due to political pressures of the royal family members. On the other hand, Majlis ash-Shura was not officially dissolved and remained ineffective until King Fahd revived it in 2000. 
 
King Fahd decreed a new Majlis ash-Shura Law on 24 November 2000, which replaced the previous law that had been effective since 1928, and decreed the bylaws of the council and their supplements on 22 August 1993. The first term council (1993–1997) had a speaker and 60 members. The membership was increased by 30 in each of the following terms: the second term 90 members (1997–2001), third term 120 members (2001–2005) and fourth term 150 members (2005–2009). Thus, the number of members increased to 150 members plus the speaker in the fourth term council.

Having been expanded in 1997 and 2001, the council achieved a place in the International Parliamentary Union by the end of 2003. The fourth term council held 845 sessions and issued 1174 declarations during its second year. In September 2011, just a few days before the 2011 municipal elections, King Abdullah stated that women may become members of the council.

In January 2013, King Abdullah issued two royal decrees, granting women thirty seats on the council, and stating that women must always hold at least a fifth of the seats on the council. According to the decrees, the female council members must be "committed to Islamic Shariah disciplines without any violations" and be "restrained by the religious veil." The decrees also said that the female council members would be entering the council building from special gates, sit in seats reserved for women and pray in special worshipping places. Earlier, officials said that a screen would separate genders and an internal communications network would allow men and women to communicate. Women first joined the council in 2013, and three were named as deputy chairpersons of three committees: Thurayya Obeid (deputy chairwoman of the human rights and petitions committee), Zainab Abu Talib (deputy chairwoman of the information and cultural committee) and Lubna Al Ansari (deputy chairwoman of the health affairs and environment committee).

Leadership
Sheikh Mohammed bin Ibrahim bin Jubair, who was a respected Hanbali jurist and former Minister of Justice, was appointed as the president of the first Council term and of successive ones. He remained the president until his death in 2002, and was replaced by Saleh bin Abdullah bin Homaid.

The fifth term council (2009–2012), which started on 28 February 2009, included the topic of no women and is led by chairman Dr. Abdullah bin Mohammed al ash Sheikh, who is former minister of Justice. He is regarded as a highly respected Islamic scholar, and its appointment is considered to be a move to reassure religious conservatives that the Majlis is being guided by Sharia in its deliberations.

The deputy chairman in the fifth term is Dr. Bandar bin Mohammed Hamza Asad Hajar. Assistant chairman was Abdulrahman bin Abdullah Al Barrak from February 2009 to December 2011. Secretary-general of the Assembly is Mohammed A. Al Ghamdi. Al Ghamdi, whose four-year term expired in May 2012, was replaced by Mohammed al Amr as the new secretary general of the council.

Members
The Council members appear to be chosen from different provinces, representing three significant groups: religious establishment, bureaucracy and the business groups. They seem to be followers of both conservative and liberal ideologies, and are usually highly educated and experienced people who are regarded as experts in their fields. Mostly academics, retired senior officers, ex-civil servants and businessmen have been chosen as the members of the council.

2005–2009 term
The distribution of members based on their occupation for the 2005–2009 (fourth) term is as follows:

2009–2013 term
During the 2009–2013 term, half of the members (43% of the new appointees) had a university education in the United States, and 70% of them had PhDs. The Council members for the 2009–2013 term are considered to be technocrats who are experts rather than local leaders. Their educational background was as follows: 16% bachelor's degrees; 13% master's degrees; 70% PhDs; and 1% MDs. The distribution of the members in terms of countries where they were educated is as follows: 49% in the United States; 29% in Saudi Arabia; 16% in the United Kingdom; 3% in France; 1% in Germany; 1% in Egypt; and 1% in Pakistan.

The representation of provinces at the council is given below:

2013–present
Since 2013, the Assembly has included 30 women members out of the total of 150 members.

Committees
In its original form, the Council consisted of eight specialized committees. These committees were identified in December 1995. Committees and their allocated number of members were as follows: Committee on Social and Health Affairs (7 members); Committee on Economic and Financial Affairs (8 members); Committee on Legislation and Administration (5 members); Committee on Foreign Affairs (7 members); Committee on Islamic Affairs (7 members); Committee on Service and the Public Sector (8 members); Committee on Education, Culture and Information Affairs (9 members); and Committee on Security Affairs (6 members).

Later, the number of the committees was expanded. , the assembly consists of thirteen committees:

 Islamic, Judicial Affairs
 Social, Family, and Youth Affairs Committee
 Economic Affairs and Energy Committee
 Security Affairs Committee
 Educational and Scientific Research Affairs Committee
 Cultural and Informational Affairs Committee
 Foreign Affairs Committee
 Health and Environmental Affairs Committee
 Financial Affairs Committee
 Transportation, Communications, Information Technology Committee
 Water and Public Facilities and Services Committee
 Administration, Human Resources and Petitions Committee
 Human Rights and Petitions.

Women members 
Women were first allowed to join the council in 2013. As of October 2017, women make up 20% of the Assembly's total number, slightly more than the 115th United States Congress (19.3%), highlighting the improvement in female status in Saudi Arabia. Among these are Sara bint Faisal Al Saud and Moudi bint Khalid Al Saud, both members of the Saudi royal family. As of December 2016, the following women were members of the council:

 Khawla Sami Alkuraya 
 Ahlam Mohammed al-Hakmi (academic scholar, dean at Jazan University)
 Asma Saleh al-Zahrani (academic scholar)
 Iqbal zain al-Abedin Darandri (statistics and research)
 Amal Salama al-Shaman
 Jawaher Dhafer al-Anizi
 Jawhara Nasser al-Yami
 Hamda Maqbool al-Joufi
 Hanan Abdulrahman al-Ahmadi (Associate professor of health administration at the Institute of Public Administration); Assistant Speaker since October 2020
 Raedah Abdullah Abunayan
 Zainab Abu Taleb
 Samia Abdullah Bakhari (academic and religious scholar)
 Sultanah Abdulmusleh al-Bidwi (educationalist)
 Alia Aldahlawi (researcher in microbiology)
 Fatimah al-Shehri
 Fardous Saud al-Saleh (doctorate in nuclear physics)
 Fawzia Aba al-Khail (Fawziyya Abu Khalid?)
 Kawthar al-Arbash (writer and journalist)
 Latifa Ahmad al-Buainain
 Latifah Ashaalan (Associate professor of psychology at Princess Nora bint Abdul Rahman University)
 Lina K. Almaeena (member of the Kingdom Young Business Women Council)
 Mona Almushait (Associate professor in obstetrics and gynecology at King Khalid University)
 Mastourah Obaid Al-Shammari
 Nihad Al-Jishi
 Nora Abdulrahman Al-Yousif
 Nora Faraj al-Musaed (sociology professor at King Abdulaziz University)
 Nora Al-Shaaban
 Nora Mohammed al-Merri (researcher on Arabic literature)
 Huda Abdurahman Al-Halisi
 Mody AlKhalaf (diplomat)

See also

Saad Albazei
Unicameral legislature
Ibrahim Al-Buleihi
Politics of Saudi Arabia
List of legislatures by country
Abdullah Mohammed Al-Hugail

References

External links

 IPU report on the Saudi Shura

1926 establishments in Saudi Arabia
Politics of Saudi Arabia